Kelly Miles (born January 1, 1962) is an American politician who has served in the Utah House of Representatives from the 11th district since 2017.

References

1962 births
Living people
Republican Party members of the Utah House of Representatives
Place of birth missing (living people)
21st-century American politicians
Politicians from Ogden, Utah